Santogold may refer to:

 Santigold (born 1976), American singer formerly known as Santogold
 Santogold (album), a 2008 album by Santigold
 Santo Gold, a mail-order jewelry business operated by Santo Victor Rigatuso, the producer of Blood Circus (film)